Mohsen Rezaee (born Sabzevar Rezaee Mirgha'ed on 1 September 1954) is an Iranian conservative politician affiliated with the Resistance Front of Islamic Iran and senior military officer in the Islamic Revolutionary Guard Corps, who currently holds office as the Vice President of Iran for Economic Affairs, member of the Expediency Discernment Council, secretary of the , as well as the secretary of the Iranian government's Economic Committee. He was secretary of the Expediency Discernment Council from 1997 to 2021.

From 1980 to 1997, Rezaee was commander-in-chief of the Islamic Revolutionary Guard Corps.

Before the Iranian Revolution, Rezaee was a member of the Islamist guerilla rebel group Mansouroun and joined the Mojahedin of the Islamic Revolution Organization following the revolution.

Dubbed a "perennial candidate", Rezaee ran as a conservative presidential candidate in the 2009 elections, coming third with 1.7 percent of the vote, behind winner Mahmoud Ahmadinejad and reformist runner-up Mir-Hossein Mousavi. He was also a candidate in 2013 presidential election and received 3,884,412 votes. He ranked fourth behind winner Hassan Rouhani, runner-up Mohammad Bagher Ghalibaf and Saeed Jalili. 

In the 2021 election, Rezaee was the runner-up to the winner Ebrahim Raisi, who came victorious from the first round, garnering 3,4 million votes or slightly lower than his 2013 tally.

Early life and education

Rezaee was born in Masjed Soleyman on 9 September 1954 to a religious Bakhtiyari nomadic family. He spent his childhood and adolescence in the oil-rich city of Masjed Soleyman (Irsoleymān) in southwestern Iran.

Along with his close friends, he established the "Religion and Science Association". When he was to begin studying at a school run by National Iranian Oil Company (NIOC) in 1969, Rezaee moved to the city of Ahvaz.

At high school, he started his political and cultural struggle against the Shah's regime. In their last year of high school, he was arrested by the Shah Security service SAVAK in Ahvaz and interrogated. He was 17 when he served five months in solitary confinement. He did not stop his political activities after he was released from prison.

Rezaee arrived in Tehran in 1974 to study mechanical engineering at Iran University of Science and Technology. He studied and worked at the same time. SAVAK intensified its crackdown on guerrilla groups to which he was a member. He had to abandon the university.

He launched provincial branches of Mansouroun guerrilla fighters in seven provinces. When Ruhollah Khomeini returned home from exile, the Mansouroun group was tasked with protecting the revolutionary leader. After the 1979 Islamic Revolution, seven armed Muslim groups teamed up and established the Islamic Revolution Mujahideen Organization to safeguard the nascent Islamic Revolution.

Although he studied mechanical engineering at Iran University of Science and Technology before the 1979 Islamic Revolution, Rezaee switched to economics after the Iran–Iraq War, studying at Tehran University and received his PhD in 2001.

Career

Rezaee joined the Islamic Revolutionary Guard Corps (IRGC) and later was appointed chief of its intelligence division. He was appointed as the IRGC commander by Ruhollah Khomeini, and after it grew in organizational complexity he assumed the office of IRGC's commander-in-chief on 11 September 1981, when he was 27 years old, and remained in the post until he announced his retirement from all of his military posts. He actively participated in the Iran–Iraq War. In 1986, he was named member of the Supreme Defense Council.

Rezaee was removed from the IRGC in 1997 due to pressures from the followers of the then president Mohammad Khatami. Another reason for his dismissal was his failure to respond to the perceived threat of attack from the US. He was replaced by Yahya Rahim Safavi.

He became a member of Expediency Discernment Council and then its secretary in August 1997. He was also appointed chair of the commission for macroeconomics and commerce. In addition, he is a reviewer of Iran's 2025 version development.

Rezaee founded the news website Tabnak, originally Baztab, in 2002 as a reaction to the proliferation of reformist websites. He also co-founded Imam Hossein University and teaches there.

It is reported that he returned to IRGC in 2015.

Presidential campaigns
Rezaee was a candidate of the presidential election of 2005, but withdrew on 15 June 2005, only two days before the election. Rezaee mentioned withdrawing from the race for "the integration of the nation's votes" and "their effectiveness". He did not endorse any candidate.

On 23 April 2009, he announced that he entered the 2009 presidential race, after trying to find another conservative to run against President Ahmadinejad, which he lost. He was also a candidate in the 2013 election. Rezaee announced his run for presidency in October 2012.

On 12 December 2016, Rezaee announced that he "has no decision to run for president" in 2017 election. However, in February 2017 he told press that if asked by the Popular Front of Islamic Revolutionary Forces to stand, he "will think about it".

Views
In 1988, Rezaee sent a letter to Ayatollah Khomeini, arguing that the Iran–Iraq War could not be won.

In the run-up to the 2009 Iranian elections, Rezaee criticized opposing candidate Mahmoud Ahmadinejad's public comments questioning the Holocaust as "not useful" for Iran's international standing. Rezaee stated on 2 August 2009 that the ongoing trials of so-called 'prisoners' was an unjust act, issuing a letter on behalf of the Expediency Council of which he is the secretary, condemning the government.

In September 2019, Rezaee expressed his hope that Iran would capture US President Donald Trump and place him on trial.

Controversy
A clash and the disagreement over strategy to be adopted in the Iran-Iraq war emerged between Ali Sayed Shirazi, commander of land forces, and Rezaee in July 1986. When this rivalry became public, Ayatollah Khomeini met them in his residence on 19 July 1986 and urged them to "seek unity", telling them "You must endeavor, not to think in terms of being members of the Armed Forces or those of the Guards Corps or of the Basij forces. ... We must understand that if there were to be any disputes among you ... not only are we doomed here and now, but we also are guilty before God."

In November 2006, Argentine Judge Rodolfo Canicoba Corral issued international arrest warrants for Rezaee, six other Iranians, and one Lebanese in connection with the AMIA bombing, the attacks on 18 July 1994, a suicide bombing of the Jewish cultural center (AMIA) in Buenos Aires, Argentina, which resulted in the deaths of 85 people and serious injuries to 151. The attack on the Jewish cultural center came two years after the 1992 terrorist bombing of the Israeli embassy in Buenos Aires. In 1998, Rezaee's son, Ahmad, defected to the United States, where he told officials that the attack on the Israeli embassy in Buenos Aires was planned in Tehran. The son told U.S. authorities that he had accompanied his father to Lebanon to witness the training. Ahmad Rezaee returned to Iran after a short time and declared that his statements about his father's involvement in the bombing were baseless. Mohsen Rezaee has been on the official Wanted list of Interpol since March 2007, for allegations of "Aggravated Murder and Damages" related to the 1994 AMIA bombing case. Rezaee rejected the allegations, saying in June 2009 "These charges were a sheer lie".

Electoral history

Personal life
Rezaee married in 1974. He has five children, two sons and three daughters. His eldest son, Ahmad, migrated to the United States in 1998 and sought political asylum.

Ahmad spoke against the policies of the Iranian Islamic government, and accused his father and others of supporting terrorist acts. He returned to Iran in 2005, recanting his statements, then migrated to the United Arab Emirates in 2011. On 13 November 2011, his body was found in a hotel in Dubai. It was reported that he was killed by a hotel servant, but the Dubai Police stated that he had died after taking a large quantity of antidepressants. His brother, Omidvar, is a member of the Parliament of Iran since 2008.

Works

 Iran at future horizon
 Fath's orders
 Iran and Middle East
 Look of the Sun
 I want to die like a cloud
 186 Pilgrim notes
 Regional Iran
 Answer to some questions about War
 Establishment of Badr's Sepah
 Explanation of trade flows on industrial productivity in Iran
 Rights of the accused in the court system
 Hidden Hands
 The third face of economic jihad
 Ahmad Kazemi's biography
 Model for cultural policy and planning
 Who was Ebrahim Hemat?
 The second wave of the Revolution
 Economic Federalism
 Monetary theory, and general equilibrium Atyar

See also 
 List of Iranian two-star generals since 1979
 List of Iranian commanders in the Iran–Iraq War

References

 Iran Human Rights Documentation Center. "Violent Aftermath: The 2009 Election and Suppression of Dissent in Iran". Feb. 2010, New Haven, CT. p. 5

External links

 
 

1954 births
Living people
Iran University of Science and Technology alumni
Academic staff of Imam Hossein University
Islamic Revolutionary Guard Corps major generals
Staff of Imam Hossein University
Candidates for President of Iran
People from Khuzestan Province
Members of the Expediency Discernment Council
Bakhtiari people
People from Masjed Soleyman
Recipients of the Order of Fath
Resistance Front of Islamic Iran politicians
Iranian news website owners (people)
Mojahedin of the Islamic Revolution Organization politicians
Popular Front of Islamic Revolution Forces politicians
Spiritual leaders of political parties in Iran
Islamic Revolutionary Guard Corps personnel of the Iran–Iraq War
Iranian individuals subject to the U.S. Department of the Treasury sanctions
Vice presidents of Iran for Economic Affairs